Osvaldo Carvajal (15 November 1914 – 11 July 1991) was a Chilean footballer. He played in four matches for the Chile national football team in 1941. He was also part of Chile's squad for the 1941 South American Championship.

References

External links
 

1914 births
1991 deaths
Chilean footballers
Chile international footballers
Place of birth missing
Association football midfielders
Club de Deportes Green Cross footballers